Robert Welch may refer to:

People
Robert Welch (designer) (1929–2000), British designer and silversmith
Robert Welch (San Jose), mayor of San Jose, California from 1962–1964
Robert Welch (photographer) (1859–1936), Irish photographer
Robert Welch (Wisconsin politician) (born 1958), Wisconsin politician
 Robert Welch or Robert Fuller, American wrestler
Robert Anthony Welch (1947–2013), Irish author and scholar
 Robert Alonzo Welch (1872–1952), American industrialist and founder of the Robert A. Welch Foundation for chemistry research in Texas
Robert S. Welch (1944–2016), American academic administrator
Robert V. Welch (1927–1992), American businessman, politician, and civic leader
Robert W. Welch Jr. (1899–1985), American anti-communist and co-founder of the John Birch Society
Bo Welch (Robert Welch, born 1951), American film production designer

Other
Robert Welch University, online university

See also
Bob Welch (disambiguation)
Robert Welsh (disambiguation)